Pavlina Hoti was a member of the Assembly of the Republic of Albania for the Democratic Party of Albania.

See also
Politics of Albania

References

Living people
Democratic Party of Albania politicians
21st-century Albanian politicians
Year of birth missing (living people)
Members of the Parliament of Albania
Women members of the Parliament of Albania
21st-century Albanian women politicians